The 2021–22 Marist Red Foxes men's basketball team represented Marist College in the 2021–22 NCAA Division I men's basketball season. The Red Foxes, led by fourth-year head coach John Dunne, played their home games at the McCann Arena in Poughkeepsie, New York as members of the Metro Atlantic Athletic Conference. 

They finished the season 14–16 overall, and 9–11 in MAAC play to finish in a tie for fifth place. As the No. 6 seed in the MAAC tournament, they were upset in the first round by No. 11 seed Quinnipiac 52–77.

Previous season

The Red Foxes finished the 2020–21 season 12–9 overall, 10–8 in MAAC play to finish in a tie for third place. As the No. 4 seed in the 2021 MAAC tournament, they were defeated by No. 5 seed Niagara in the quarterfinals 62–67. This marked the first overall and conference winning season for the Red Foxes since 2007–08 when they finished 18–14 overall, and 11–7 in the MAAC, and a tie for fifth place.

Offseason

Departures

Incoming transfers

Roster

Schedule and results

|-
!colspan=9 style=";"| Regular season

|-
!colspan=12 style=";"| MAAC tournament
|-

|-

Awards
Following the season, two Marist players were selected to the All-MAAC teams, freshman guard Jao Ituka and sophomore guard Ricardo Wright. Ituka was the unanimous selection for the 2022 Metro Atlantic Athletic Conference Men's Basketball Rookie of the Year, as well as being selected to the All-MAAC Second Team. Ituka led the team in scoring at 15.3 points per game, third in the MAAC, and shot 52.6% from the field, which was 59th best in all NCAA for the season. Wright was selected on the All-MAAC Third Team after being selected to the All-Rookie Team last season. Wright was 10th in the MAAC in scoring average at 13.6 points per game, and sixth in three-point percentage at .383.

Statistics

Players

MAAC Leaders
Scoring
Jao Ituka (15.3/game): 3rd
Ricardo Wright (13.6/game): 10th

Rebounding
Matt Herasme (4.9/game): 21st

Field Goal Percentage (minimum avg 5 attempted per game)
Jordan Jones (98–158 .620): 2nd
Samkelo Cele (104–229 .454): 16th

Free Throw Percentage (minimum avg 3 attempted per game)
Jao Ituka (109–142 .768): 11th

Steals Per Game
Raheim Sullivan (1.1/game): 10th

3-Point Field Goal Percentage (minimum avg 2 attempted per game)
Raheim Sullivan (23–54 .426): 2nd
Ricardo Wright (58–155 .374): 6th
Noah Harris (48–137 .350): 16th

3-Point Field Goals Made
Ricardo Wright (58): 9th
Noah Harris (48): 14th

Blocked Shots
Jordan Jones (35): 5th
Victor Enoh (17): 21st

Minutes Played
Matt Herasme (29.7/game): 22nd
 Ricardo Wright (29.0/game): 23rd

To qualify, players must have appeared in 75% of team's games.

References

Marist Red Foxes men's basketball seasons
Marist Red Foxes
Marist Red Foxes men's basketball
Marist Red Foxes men's basketball